HMAS Melbourne (FFG 05) was an Adelaide-class guided-missile frigate of the Royal Australian Navy, which entered service in 1992. Melbourne has been deployed to the Persian Gulf on several occasions, and served as part of the INTERFET peacekeeping taskforce in 2000. On 26 October 2019, Melbourne was decommissioned from the RAN, subsequently being transferred to Chile. The ship was commissioned into the Chilean Navy as Almirante Latorre on 15 April 2020.

Design and construction

Following the cancellation of the Australian light destroyer project in 1973, the British Type 42 destroyer and the American Oliver Hazard Perry-class frigate were identified as alternatives to replace the cancelled light destroyers and the Daring-class destroyers. Although the Oliver Hazard Perry class was still at the design stage, the difficulty of fitting the Type 42 with the SM-1 missile, and the success of the Perth-class acquisition (a derivative of the American Charles F. Adams-class destroyer) compared to equivalent British designs led the Australian government to approve the purchase of two US-built Oliver Hazard Perry-class frigates in 1976. A third was ordered in 1977, followed by a fourth, with all four ships integrated into the USN's shipbuilding program. A further two ships (including Melbourne) were ordered in 1980, and were constructed in Australia.

Propulsion machinery consists of two General Electric LM2500 gas turbines, which provide a combined  to the single propeller shaft. Standard ship's company is 184, including 15 officers, but excluding the flight crew for the embarked helicopters.

Original armament for the ship consisted of a Mark 13 missile launcher configured to fire RIM-66 Standard and RGM-84 Harpoon missiles, supplemented by an OTO Melara  gun and a Vulcan Phalanx point-defence system. As part of the mid-2000s FFG Upgrade Project, an eight-cell Mark 41 Vertical Launch System was fitted, with a payload of RIM-162 Evolved Sea Sparrow missiles. For anti-submarine warfare, two Mark 32 torpedo tube sets are fitted; originally firing the Mark 44 torpedo, the Adelaides later carried the Mark 46, then the MU90 Impact following the FFG Upgrade. Up to six  machine guns can be carried for close-in defence, and since 2005, two M2HB .50 calibre machine guns in Mini Typhoon mounts have been installed when needed for Persian Gulf deployments. The sensor suite includes an AN/SPS-49 air search radar, AN/SPS-55 surface search and navigation radar, SPG-60 fire control radar connected to a Mark 92 fire control system, and a Mulloka hull-mounted sonar. Two helicopters can be embarked: either two S-70B Seahawk or one Seahawk and one AS350B Squirrel.

The ship was laid down by AMECON at Williamstown, Victoria on 12 July 1985. She was launched on 5 May 1989. Melbourne was commissioned into the RAN on 15 February 1992.

Operational history

In 1996, the frigate was deployed to the Persian Gulf.

Melbourne was deployed to East Timor as part of the Australian-led INTERFET peacekeeping taskforce from 20 January to 23 February 2000.

In 2002, Melbourne participated in the third rotation of RAN ships to the Persian Gulf as part of Operation Slipper, where she enforced United Nations sanctions against Iraq. In 2003, the ship returned to Iraqi waters in support of Operation Catalyst, protecting Iraqi territorial waters following Operation Iraqi Freedom.

Following an overhaul of the RAN battle honours system, completed in March 2010, Melbourne was awarded the honours "East Timor 2000" and "Persian Gulf 2002".

On 16 August 2010, Melbourne was deployed to the Middle East for the third time, again as part of Operation Slipper. During the six-month deployment, the frigate participated in anti-piracy operations in the Arabian Sea and responded to 14 distress calls from merchant vessels, including the British chemical tanker MV CPO China on 3 January 2011. Although it took six hours for Melbourne to close with CPO China, the merchant ship's crew secured themselves in the citadel, and the pirates retreated when the frigate and her Seahawk helicopter arrived. Melbourne returned to Sydney on 18 February 2011.

Between 5 and 7 February 2014, while deployed off Tanzania, Melbourne seized and destroyed  of heroin from smuggling vessels. On 18 February, while operating off Oman's Masirah Island, Melbourne and the Pakistani frigate PNS Alamgir intercepted and boarded a dhow found to be carrying  of cannabis resin. In September 2018 Melbourne operated off the Korean Peninsula to enforce sanctions against North Korea as part of Operation Argos.

Melbourne returned to Fleet Base East from her final deployment on 27 September 2019. She was decommissioned on 26 October 2019.

On December 27, 2019, it was announced that she and Newcastle had been sold to Chile.

Melbourne was commissioned into the Chilean navy on 15 April 2020 as Chilean ship Almirante Latorre, pennant number FFG-14.

Citations

References
Books

Journal articles

Websites

External links

 

Adelaide-class frigates
Adelaide-class frigates of the Chilean Navy
Ships built in Victoria (Australia)
1989 ships